Frank Houghton (1894–1972) was an Anglican missionary bishop and author.

Houghton was born in Stafford and  educated at London University and ordained in 1917. He held curacies at St Benedict, Everton and All Saints, Preston before heading to China as a missionary with the China Inland Mission in 1920. In 1923 he married Dorothy Cassels the daughter of William Cassels, who had been a member of the Cambridge Seven and became a bishop in China. Houghton was general director of the China Inland Mission at the time when the Mission had to leave China in 1951. He was Bishop of Eastern Szechwan from 1937 to 1940. Returning to England he held incumbencies at St Marks, New Milverton, Leamington and St Peter's, Drayton, Banbury. He retired in 1963 and died on 25 January 1972.

Works
Houghton's books include “The Two Hundred”, 1932; “China Calling”, 1936; “If We Believe” 1952; “Amy Carmichael of Dohnavur”, 1953; “The Fire Burns On”, 1964; and “Living Your Life”, 1966.

He also wrote the hymns "Facing a task unfinished", "My Lord, who in the desert fed", "O Thou who dost direct my feet" and "Thou who wast rich beyond all splendour".

See also 
 Anglicanism in Sichuan

References
 

Alumni of the University of London
Anglican missionaries in Sichuan
Anglican missionary bishops in China
1894 births
1972 deaths
People from Stafford
20th-century Anglican bishops in China
Diocese of Szechwan
Anglican bishops of East Szechwan

Evangelical Anglican bishops